The Plunderer is a fictional character appearing in American comic books published by Marvel Comics. The character exists in Marvel's shared universe, known as the Marvel Universe.

Publication history
The character of the Plunderer was initially introduced in the Marvel comic book Daredevil #12 (January 1966), and was created by writer Stan Lee and artist Jack Kirby. He was the brother of the character Ka-Zar, as revealed in his origin story in Daredevil #13.

He also made significant appearances in subsequent comics throughout the 60's, 70's, and early 80's, including Tales to Astonish #95-98 (September-December 1967), Marvel Super-Heroes #19 (March 1969), Astonishing Tales #11 (April 1972), and #17-20 (April-June 1973), Fantastic Four #191 (February 1978), Rom #13 (December 1980), and Ka-Zar the Savage #31-33 (April, June and August 1984). However, the character faded into obscurity for many years, until he served as a main antagonist for the first half of Ka-Zar's eponymous 1997 title by writer Mark Waid and artist Andy Kubert, from issues #1-10 (May 1997-February 1998).

The Plunderer was apparently killed by the Punisher in Punisher War Journal (vol. 2) #2 (February 2007) during Marvel's Civil War event. This led to a turning point in the storyline involving Captain America's activities during the Civil War, as he was intending to allow supervillains to join his side and the Punisher's actions prevented this.

However, the Plunderer re-appeared a short time later in Marvel Comics Presents (vol. 2) #5-6 (March-April 2008), explaining the man who had died had not been him but his "American representative."

Fictional character biography
Parnival Plunder was the younger brother of Kevin Plunder. When their father Robert discovered the Savage Land, word leaked out and he sent Kevin to live there and Parnival to live as a sailor to keep them safe. Believing Kevin had been killed, Parnival established himself as the lord of Castle Plunder as a front for his criminal activities as the Plunderer. Upon learning that his brother had survived in the Savage Land as Ka-Zar, the two clashed on several occasions, mostly over Parnival's obsession with Antarctic vibranium.

The Plunderer came into conflict with the Fantastic Four at one point, when he tried to steal Reed's lab equipment while the team had temporarily disbanded.

Parnival later allied with a clone of Thanos in a scheme to steal the equipment that maintains the Savage Land's idyllic environment. The Plunderer hires a man named Gregor to arm one Savage Land tribe with laser rifles to attack Ka-Zar, and kidnap Ka-Zar's son Matthew while Ka-Zar is occupied. Ka-Zar and his wife Shanna the She-Devil rescue the baby and discover that Parnival employed Gregor, so Ka-Zar travels to New York City to find out why his brother wanted him killed. While there, the Rhino attacks Ka-Zar on Parnival's behalf, though Ka-Zar turns the Rhino into a weapon against his brother. Shanna, who had followed Ka-Zar to New York, is then attacked by the Plunderer's men. Parnival is then able to smuggle the Savage Land's terraforming machinery into New York City, which has devastating effects on the Savage Land.

During the Civil War, the Plunderer hoped to ally himself with Captain America, but the Punisher executed him before Captain America could intervene. Plunderer later resurfaced and revealed his "American representative" had been killed and not him.

During the Infinity storyline, Plunderer and his men are stopped from stealing robot parts by Heroes for Hire. Plunderer tries to escape, but he is stopped by the Superior Spider-Man (Doctor Octopus' mind in Peter Parker's body).

The moralities of Plunderer and three members of his gang are inverted during the events of AXIS due to them secretly being present on Genosha during the battle against Red Onslaught. Plunderer's new outlook on life prompts him to try to become a Robin Hood-like figure who donates a cut of what he steals to "starving orphans". When Plunderer tries to rob a corrupt company called Cortex Incorporated, he and his gang are stopped by Captain America.

Plunderer, somehow restored to normal, reappears during All-New, All-Different Marvel embarking on a crime spree that is halted by the New Avengers.

Other versions

What If?
Plunderer was seen in an issue of What If? where it revolved around the Savage Land terraforming toward New York. Both he and Ka-Zar sacrifice themselves to return New York to normal.

Notes

References
 Plunderer at Marvel Wiki
 Plunderer at Comic Vine
 

Characters created by Jack Kirby
Characters created by Stan Lee
Comics characters introduced in 1966
Fictional pirates
Marvel Comics supervillains